Callidula erycinoides is a moth in the family Callidulidae. It was described by Felder in 1874. It is found on the Indonesia islands of Ternate, Halhamera and Bacan.

References

Callidulidae
Moths described in 1874